Sir Michael D'Anvers (29 September 1738 – 20 August 1776) was the 5th and last baronet of the D'Anvers baronets, of Culworth.

Education
D'Anvers of Culworth was educated at John Roysse's Free School in Abingdon, (now Abingdon School).

Career
He was High Sheriff of Northamptonshire from 1763–64.

Peerage
He succeeded his brother Sir Henry D'Anvers, 4th Baronet to the title in 1753 and is commemorated with a memorial on the north wall of the chancel at Culworth Church. He was unmarried and on his death left the estate to his sister Meriel D'Anvers.

See also
 List of Old Abingdonians

References

1738 births
1776 deaths
Baronets in the Baronetage of England
People educated at Abingdon School
High Sheriffs of Northamptonshire